Glory ~ Shining Energy (辉煌), known as  in Japan, is the second China/Japan studio album by Chinese band Twelve Girls Band. It was released on January 1, 2004 through Toshiba EMI. The album was certified Platinum by the Recording Industry Association of Japan. It consists of fifteen songs in a sort of modernized Chinese form.

Track listing
 The Great Canyon
 Glory (As Kiko in Japanese Version)
 Ii Hi Tabidachi
 Shining Energy
 Asu e no Tobira
 Loulan Girl
 Reel Around The Sun
 Only Time
 Jasmin
 Toki No Nagare Ni Mi Wo Makase
 Fantasy
 Swan Lake
 Flame
 Prayer
 Butterfly

References

2004 albums
Twelve Girls Band albums